Acetyl bromide is an acyl bromide compound. As is expected, it may be prepared by reaction between phosphorus tribromide and acetic acid:

 3 CH3COOH + PBr3 → 3 CH3COBr + H3PO3

As usual for an acid halide, acetyl bromide hydrolyzes rapidly in water, forming acetic acid and hydrobromic acid. It also reacts with alcohols and amines to produce acetate esters and acetamides, respectively.

References

Acyl bromides